Methley railway station was opened in 1841 by the North Midland Railway on its line from Derby to Leeds. At one time, there were three railway stations in Methley and in 1950, British Railways renamed it Methley North. It closed in 1957.

Slightly to the south, the Lancashire and Yorkshire Railway made a north-facing junction of its line from Knottingley and it built its own station (Methley Junction). This station opened on 1 October 1849 and closed on 4 October 1943.

A third station was built by the Methley Joint Railway, a line in which the L&YR, the GNR and the NER were shareholders. This station, opened on 1 May 1869, known as Methley Joint station was closed as Methley South on 7 March 1960.

References

External links
 Methley North station (shown open) on navigable 1947 O. S. map

Disused railway stations in Leeds
Railway stations in Great Britain opened in 1841
Railway stations in Great Britain closed in 1957
Former Midland Railway stations
Rothwell, West Yorkshire